Scinax jolyi is a species of frog in the family Hylidae.
It is endemic to French Guiana.
Its natural habitats are subtropical or tropical moist lowland forests and swamps.

References

jolyi
Amphibians described in 2001
Taxonomy articles created by Polbot